USS Greiner (DE-37) was an  constructed for the United States Navy during World War II. She was promptly sent off into the Pacific Ocean to protect convoys and other ships from Japanese submarines and fighter aircraft. She performed dangerous work in numerous battle areas, and was awarded three battle stars.

She was originally intended for Great Britain under lend-lease, was launched as BDE-37 on 20 May 1943 by the Puget Sound Navy Yard, Bremerton, Washington and commissioned on 18 August 1943.

Namesake
Kenneth Frederick Greiner was born on 27 April 1910 in Hibbing, Minnesota. He enlisted as a Seaman, Second Class on 28 September 1935. He became an Aviation Cadet in 1936, underwent flight training, and was honorably discharged on 7 April 1936. Lieutenant (junior grade) Greiner was appointed to the United States Naval Reserve on 29 March 1941, and after attending an aeronautical engineering course at the University of Minnesota reported to Naval Air Station, Dutch Harbor, Alaska on 1 October 1941. He was killed in action there on 4 June 1942 during the Japanese Battle of Dutch Harbor.

Service history
Following shakedown and training exercise along the California-Washington coast, Greiner sailed for Pearl Harbor, reaching there on 31 October 1943. A series of training and patrol operations kept her in the Hawaiian area until 23 December, when she sailed for recently won Tarawa as flagship of Escort Squadron 28 (EscSquad 28). Greiner spent virtually a year in the Gilbert Islands-Marshall Islands area, as the great American island offensive swept westward toward Japan. The ship performed a variety of tasks, including the most important job of escorting transport vessels to the assault areas. She rescued 13 men from a downed PBM Mariner on 26 January 1944, and shelled Kusaie in the Caroline Islands, in reply to a salvo from Japanese batteries, on 1 June.

Greiner spent 3 months at Pearl Harbor for repairs and operations from July–October, and after antisubmarine exercises in Hawaiian waters spent December patrolling around Wotje, Mili, Jaluit, and Maloelap, "leapfrogged" earlier in the war. She spent the remainder of the war in the Gilberts and Marshalls plane-guarding and screening escort carrier forces, except for a short voyage to Okinawa 29 June-3 July 1945.

Greiner steamed back to the United States from Kerama Retto on 3 July, and arrived San Francisco, California on 28 July.

She decommissioned at Oakland, California on 19 November 1945 and was stricken from the Naval Vessel Register on 5 December. The ship was subsequently sold to J. G. Berkwit & Co. on 10 February 1945, and resold in 1947.

Awards

References

External links

NavSource Online: Destroyer Escort Photo Archive - DE-37 - USS Greiner

Evarts-class destroyer escorts
World War II frigates and destroyer escorts of the United States
Ships built in Bremerton, Washington
1943 ships